Po Biddy Crossroads is an unincorporated community in Talbot County, Georgia, United States.

History
Po Biddy Crossroads acquired its name following a dinner party in the community where fried chicken was served.  When a guest took the last piece of chicken, a female guest exclaimed, "there goes the last of the po' biddy!" (Southern vernacular for "poor little chicken").  The name "Po Biddy" was later proposed by someone registering a filling station at the settlement, "and the community has borne the moniker ever since".

References

Unincorporated communities in Georgia (U.S. state)
Unincorporated communities in Talbot County, Georgia